Talhouni is a surname found in Jordan.

Notable people with the surname include:

Bahjat Talhouni (1913–1994), Jordanian politician and Prime Minister
Bassam Talhouni (born 1964), Jordanian politician and lawyer
Khaldoun Talhouni, Jordanian diplomat
Nabil Talhouni, Jordanian diplomat

Jordanian families
Arabic-language surnames